Naurangpur is a village in Gurgaon Mandal, Gurgaon District, Haryana state, India.

Naurangpur may also refer to the following places in India:
 Naurangpur, Bhulath, Kapurthala district, Punjab State
 Naurangpur, Punjab, Jalandhar district, Punjab State
 Naurangpur, a village in Uttar Pradesh, on the Sarayan river
 Naurangpur, a village in Mahnar block, Vaishali district, Bihar state
 Norangpur, one of two villages in Uttar Pradesh, India
 Nourangpur, a village in Madhya Pradesh, India
 Nourangpur, a village in Uttar Pradesh, India
 Narangpur, a village in Uttar Pradesh, India

See also
 Narangpur, a village in Kapurthala district, Punjab State, India